This is a partial list of Canadian Inuit. The Arctic and subarctic dwelling Inuit (formerly referred to as Eskimo) are a group of culturally similar indigenous Canadians inhabiting the Northwest Territories, Nunavut, Nunavik (Quebec) and Nunatsiavut (Labrador) that are collectivity referred to as Inuit Nunangatt .

The names of the communities are given as they were at the time of the birth or death. Those people who were born or died prior to 1 April 1999 in what is now Nunavut were actually born in the Northwest Territories.

Notes

Inuit
 
Inuit
Inuit